In the 2022–23 season, CR Belouizdad is competing in the Ligue 1 for the 57th season, as well as the Algerian Cup. It is their 33rd consecutive season in the top flight of Algerian football. They are competing in Ligue 1, the Algerian Cup, the Super Cup and the Champions League.

Squad list
Players and squad numbers last updated on 5 February 2022.Note: Flags indicate national team as has been defined under FIFA eligibility rules. Players may hold more than one non-FIFA nationality.

Competitions

Overview

{| class="wikitable" style="text-align: center"
|-
!rowspan=2|Competition
!colspan=8|Record
!rowspan=2|Started round
!rowspan=2|Final position / round
!rowspan=2|First match	
!rowspan=2|Last match
|-
!
!
!
!
!
!
!
!
|-
| Ligue 1

|  
| To be confirmed
| 26 August 2022
| In Progress
|-
| Algerian Cup

| Round of 64 
| To be confirmed
| 14 February 2023
| In Progress
|-
| Super Cup

| Final
| To be confirmed
| colspan=2| In Progress
|-
| Champions League

| First round
| To be confirmed
| 10 September 2022
| In Progress
|-
! Total

Ligue 1

League table

Results summary

Results by round

Matches
The league fixtures were announced on 19 July 2022.

Algerian Cup

Algerian Super Cup

Champions League

Qualifying rounds

First round

Second round

Group stage

Group D

Squad information

Playing statistics

|-
! colspan=14 style=background:#dcdcdc; text-align:center| Goalkeepers

|-
! colspan=14 style=background:#dcdcdc; text-align:center| Defenders

|-
! colspan=14 style=background:#dcdcdc; text-align:center| Midfielders

|-
! colspan=14 style=background:#dcdcdc; text-align:center| Forwards

|-
! colspan=14 style=background:#dcdcdc; text-align:center| Players transferred out during the season

Goalscorers

Includes all competitive matches. The list is sorted alphabetically by surname when total goals are equal.

Transfers

In

Summer

Out

Summer

Winter

New contracts

Notes

References

2022-23
Algerian football clubs 2022–23 season
2022–23 CAF Champions League participants seasons